Konstantinos Damianos (1853–1915) was a senior Hellenic Army officer who fought in the Balkan Wars of 1912–1913.

He was born in Athens in 1853, and graduated from the Hellenic Military Academy on 7 February 1878 as an Artillery Adjutant. He fought in the Epirus front of the Greco-Turkish War of 1897 with the rank of Major.

In 1911, he was named CO of the 3rd Infantry Division at Missolonghi, which he also commanded during the Balkan Wars, with the rank of Major General. In 1914 he was promoted to Lieutenant General and assigned the command of the newly constituted IV Army Corps at Kavala.

He was suspended from active service on 4 April 1915 and died in Athens on 23 September 1915.

References 

1853 births
1915 deaths
Hellenic Army lieutenant generals
Greek military personnel of the Balkan Wars
Greek military personnel of the Greco-Turkish War (1897)
Military personnel from Athens